KKND may refer to:

 KKND (FM), a radio station (106.7 FM) licensed to serve Port Sulphur, Louisiana, United States
 KMEZ (FM), a radio station (102.9 FM) licensed to serve Belle Chasse, Louisiana, United States, which held the call sign KKND from 2008 to 2018
 KFFN, a radio station (1490 AM) licensed to serve Tucson, Arizona, United States, which held the call sign KKND from 1995 to 1996
 KGFY, a radio station (105.5 FM) licensed to serve Stillwater, Oklahoma, United States, which held the call sign KKND from 1989 to 1993
KKnD (video game)